The performance data for landing an aircraft can be obtained from the aircraft's flight manual or pilot's operating handbook. It will state the distance required to bring the aircraft to a stop under ideal conditions, assuming the aircraft crosses the runway threshold at a height of 50 ft, at the correct speed. The actual landing performance of an aircraft is affected by many variables which must be taken into account.

Factors affecting landing performance

Weight
The weight of an aircraft is one of the basic factors that determines the landing distance required by an aircraft. An increase in weight increases the stall speed of the aircraft. Stall is a reduction in the lift coefficient generated by a wing as angle of attack increases. Therefore, the  minimum approach speed increases as the aircraft's weight increases. The kinetic energy that has to be overcome to stop an aircraft is a function of the mass of the aircraft and the square of its speed at touchdown. The kinetic energy increases significantly as an aircraft's weight increases, and the brakes have to absorb this greater energy, increasing the landing roll of the aircraft.

Density altitude
A decrease in density of air results in decrease in both aircraft and Engine performance. High elevation airports are characterized by low pressure and high ambient temperatures. The True Airspeed (TAS) will be higher than the Indicated airspeed indicated by the Airspeed indicator to the pilot in air of low density. This increase in TAS leads to greater touchdown speed hence increases the landing roll. More energy has to be absorbed by the brakes thus demanding the need of a longer runway. An increased density altitude means a longer landing distance.

Headwinds and tailwinds
The headwind reduces the landing distance for an aircraft. Landing into a headwind reduces the ground speed (GS) for the same true airspeed (TAS).  This is beneficial to pilots as well as Air traffic controllers (ATC). An aircraft landing into a  headwind will require less runway and will be able to vacate the runway sooner. If the headwind decreases near the ground, there is a decrease in the airspeed of the aircraft and it will tend to sink and possibly undershoot the aiming point.

Tailwind increases the ground speed of an aircraft for the same TAS and thus a longer runway distance will be required for an aircraft to land. Landing in a tailwind situation could lead to the aircraft overshooting the runway and colliding with objects or terrain.

Runway surface

Runway conditions affect take off and landing performance of an aircraft. The runway may be made up of concrete, asphalt, gravel or grass. An important safety concern at airports is the contamination of the runways due to ice, snow, water, rubber deposits etc. The landing distance required by an aircraft is much more in case of low friction runways which do not facilitate effective braking to occur. Aquaplaning is a phenomenon in which directional control is lost because of the presence of film of water between the rubber tires and the runway surface. The construction of grooved surface runways and regular maintenance, especially rubber removal, both help reduce runway slipperiness and facilitate good ground handling and effective braking.

Runway slope
An up-slope runway will allow an aircraft to land in a shorter distance. A down-slope runway will require a greater landing distance. It will take longer for the aeroplane to touch down from 50 ft above the runway threshold, as the runway is falling away beneath the aeroplane. Braking while going downhill is not as effective as on a level or up-slope runway.

Flap settings
Wing flaps are hinged surfaces on the trailing edge of the wings of a fixed-wing aircraft. High flap settings help an aircraft to increase the aerodynamic drag and reduce the stalling speed so that the aircraft can fly at low speeds safely. Flaps also lower the nose of the aircraft and give the pilots a better view of the ground ahead while landing.

See also

Density altitude
Aquaplaning
Flaps
Runway

References

External links
 https://web.archive.org/web/20110906044938/http://igga.net/FAARecommendsGroovedRunways.pdf

Flight phases
Aircraft performance